The discography of American singer Poppy consists of four studio albums, three soundtrack albums, five extended plays, 21 music videos, and 31 singles. Signed to Island Records in 2014, she would release her debut single "Everybody Wants to Be Poppy" in June 2015. Her debut EP, Bubblebath, would go on to be released in February 2016, and included the critically acclaimed single "Lowlife".

Throughout 2017, Poppy would put out five singles, which would later appear on her debut studio album Poppy.Computer released in October of that year. The album was included onto Rolling Stones list of 20 Best Pop Albums of 2017, and would peak at number 11 of the Billboard Heatseekers Albums. Her follow-up album, Am I a Girl?, was released in late 2018, and featured a collaboration with American DJ Diplo on the song "Time Is Up". The second half of the album featured Poppy adopting a more rock and nu metal-influenced sound, which she would expand upon in her EP Choke, released in June 2019.

In January 2020, Poppy released her third studio album I Disagree. Fully delving in to the rock and metal influences she had dabbled in on her previous works, the album quickly became Poppy's most successful and acclaimed album to that point, and became her first album to impact the Billboard 200 chart as well as many other countries, and sold 7,000 copies during its first week.

Albums

Studio albums

Reissues

Soundtrack albums

Extended plays

Singles

As lead artist

As featured artist

Other charted songs

Guest appearances

Music videos

Songwriting credits

Notes

References

Discography
Discographies of American artists